Huyu Township (Jingpo: Hu yup or Hi yup) is a township in Ruili, Yunnan, China.

Etymology
The name of "Huyu" means a place where wild musas grow in Dai language.

Administrative division
As of 2016, the township is divided into four villages: 
Huyu
Nongxian
Banling
Leinong

History
In 1956, the Government of Ruili County set up the Huyu Production and Culture Station to maintain control of the region. During the Cultural Revolution, it was renamed "Huyu People's Commune" and then "Dongfeng People's Commune". It was incorporated as a township in 1986.

Geography
The township lies at the northwestern Ruili. To the northwest, the region is bounded by the Namwan River.

Economy
The local economy is primarily based upon agriculture. The main crops are rice, rubber, grapefruit, and dendrobium nobile.

The Ruili Huanshan Industrial Park (second-phase project) sits in the township.

Demographics

In 2016, the local population was 8,521, including 2,389 Han (28%) and 4,703 Jingpo (55.2%).

Transportation
The Longling–Ruili Expressway Nongdao Extension Road passes across the township.

References

Bibliography
 
 
 

Divisions of Ruili